Dancing Up a Storm is the second studio album by Welsh-Canadian husband-and-wife duo, The Raes. It was released on A&M Records in March 1979 and featured the hit singles, "A Little Lovin' (Keeps the Doctor Away)" and "I Only Wanna Get Up and Dance". The album peaked at number 161 on Billboard magazine's Top 200 chart.

Track listing

Studio
Mixed At – Mom & Pop's Company Store, Studio City, California
Mixed At – Sigma Sound Studios, New York City
Recorded At – Manta Sound, Toronto, Canada

Personnel
Arranger – David Van De Pitte
Backing Vocals – Cindy & Roy, Clay Hunt, David Lasley, Donna McElroy, Helen Curry, Hilda Harris, Karen Dempsey, Lani Groves, Patricia Henderson, Suzi Lane, Vicki Hampton
Producer – Harry Hinde
Master – José Rodriguez
Mixers – Michael Hutchinson, John Luongo
Bass – Bob Babbitt
Drums – Charles Collins
Guitar – Bruce Nazarian, Paul Sabu
Keyboards – Carlton Kent
Percussion – Jim Maelen, Paulinho da Costa
Saxophone – George E. Palisky, Jr.
Synthesizer – George Small

References

A&M Records albums
The Raes albums
1979 albums